Harpole is a surname. Notable people with the surname include:

Charles Harpole, American scholar of cinema and mass communications and filmmaker
Paul Harpole (born 1950), American politician and businessman